Ubbelohde may refer to:

People
 Alfred Ubbelohde (1907–1988), Belgian-born English chemist
 Leo Ubbelohde (1877–1964), German chemist
 Otto Ubbelohde (1867–1922), German painter

Other
 Ubbelohde viscometer, laboratory measuring instrument